Esmeralda, or Esmeraldeño (also called Takame or Atacame), is an extinct language isolate formerly spoken in the coastal region of Ecuador, specifically in the western part of Esmeraldas Province. The only existing data for Atacame was collected by J.M. Pallares in 1877.

Classification
It has been proposed that the language is connected to the still-spoken Yaruro language of Venezuela. It also has some lexical similarities with the extinct Yurumanguí language, as well with the southern Barbacoan language Tsafiki (especially plant and animal names).

Vocabulary
Loukotka (1968) lists the following basic vocabulary items.

{| class="wikitable"
! gloss !! Esmeralda
|-
| hand || di
|-
| foot || taha
|-
| man || ilóm
|-
| water || uivi
|-
| star || muʔxabla
|-
| earth || dula
|-
| dog || kine
|-
| jaguar || mutokine
|-
| snake || piama
|-
| house || kiama
|-
| boat || diala
|}

Further reading

References

Indigenous languages of South America
Esmeralda–Yaruroan languages
Languages of Ecuador
Language isolates of South America
Extinct languages of South America